The Silent Partner (Italian: Il socio invisibile) is a 1939 Italian drama film directed by Roberto Roberti and starring Carlo Romano, Clara Calamai and Evi Maltagliati. It is based on the 1928 novel The Partner by Jenaro Prieto, which was turned into a British film The Mysterious Mr. Davis the same year.

It was made by the Rome-based Scalera Films. The sets were designed by the art directors Gustav Abel and Alfredo Manzi.

Synopsis
A financially struggling man creates a fake business partner. His creation is an enormous success despite the fact that nobody has ever met him.

Cast

References

Bibliography
 Goble, Alan. The Complete Index to Literary Sources in Film. Walter de Gruyter, 1999.

External links
 

1939 films
Italian drama films
1939 drama films
1930s Italian-language films
Films directed by Roberto Roberti
Films based on Chilean novels
Films shot at Scalera Studios
Italian black-and-white films
1930s Italian films